Fragaria yezoensis is a species of wild strawberry native to the eastern side of the Japanese island of Hokkaidō, and the adjacent Kuril Islands and Sakhalin in Russia. It is of no economic value. Some botanists include the very similar Fragaria nipponica in F. yezoensis as a synonym.

All strawberries have a base haploid count of 7 chromosomes. Fragaria yezoensis is diploid, having 2 pairs of these chromosomes for a total of 14 chromosomes.

References

External links
Oda, Y. 2002. Photosynthetic characteristics and geographical distribution of diploid Fragaria species native in Japan. Acta Hort. 567: 381–384. Abstract.
Hummer, K.E., Sabitov, A., & Davis, T. 2005. Iturup And Sakhalin Island Strawberries. HortScience 40(4): 1127. Abstract.

yezoensis
Flora of Northeast Asia
Flora of Japan
Plants described in 1944